The Austral Launch Vehicle (ALV) is a concept for a re-usable launch vehicle first stage. It would use fly-back UAV boosters to reduce overall launch costs.

Proponents
The ALV concept is being developed  by Heliaq Advanced Engineering and the University of Queensland from Brisbane, Queensland (Australia). Additional involvement is from the United Kingdom, France and South Africa.

System

First stage
The ALV system uses between one and six boosters connected to a core. The boosters each have a V-tail system that, on launch, act as stabilising fins; during the return flight and landing, the V-tail provides directional control. After first stage separation, the boosters coast (ballistic cruise). After re-entry, at around 350 km down range, the wings deploy and the boosters manoeuvre for return flight to the launch site, using a deployable propeller driven by an engine, acting as a large UAV.

Second stage
The Second Stage core flies on after First Stage booster separation, with the stack. The core separates and returns to the atmosphere and Earth and is not recovered.

Third stage
After fairing separation, the Third Stage and Payload fly to orbit. Payload separation is as required for the mission. Third Stage deorbits and burns up on entry.

Testing
Flight tests were scheduled for late in 2015. The first successful flight of the ALV was completed on 23 December 2015.

Associated projects
 University of Queensland's SPARTAN-1 scramjet project

See also

Australian Space Agency

References

External links
 University of Queensland - Faculty of Engineering, Architecture and Information Technology
 Professor Michael Smart
 Heliaq Advanced Engineering

Proposed space launch vehicles
Space launch vehicles of Australia
Space programme of Australia